Allahabad-e Sofla (also Romanized as Allāhābād-e Soflá; also known as Allāhābād-e Pā’īn and Allāh Ābād) is a village in Howmeh Rural District, in the Central District of Shirvan County, North Khorasan Province, Iran. At the 2006 census, its population was 218, in 60 families.

References 

Populated places in Shirvan County